The 1999 Wells Fargo Sun Bowl featured the Oregon Ducks and the Minnesota Golden Gophers.

Game summary
Minnesota – Johnson 1 yard touchdown pass from Cockerham (Nystrom kick), 3:52
Oregon – Harrington 5 yard touchdown run (Villegas kick), 1:11
Minnesota – Bruce 38 yard touchdown pass from Cockerham (Nystrom kick failed), 12:42
Oregon – Harrington 1 yard touchdown run (Villegas kick), 8:04
Oregon – Villegas 37 yard field goal, 3:11
Minnesota – Johnson 7 yard touchdown pass from Cockerham (Nystrom kick), 14:56
Oregon – Howry 1 yard touchdown run

Minnesota opened the scoring with an 18-yard touchdown pass from quarterback Billy Cockerham to wide receiver Ron Johnson for a 7–0 1st quarter lead. Oregon quarterback Joey Harrington notched the equalizer when he rushed five yards for a touchdown, tying the game at 7.

In the third quarter, Cockerham fired a 38-yard touchdown pass to Arland Bruce for a 13–7 Minnesota lead. Harrington scored on a 1- yard quarterback sneak, to give Oregon a 14–13 lead. Nathan Villegas kicked a 37-yard field goal to make it 17–13. In the fourth quarter, Cockerham again found Ron Johnson for a 7-yard touchdown, and a 20–17 lead. Harrington found wide receiver Keenan Howry for a 10-yard touchdown pass and a 24–20 lead. Oregon held on and won the game.

The game's three MVP awards (overall, lineman, and special teams) were each awarded to Minnesota players, despite Oregon winning the game, due (at least in part) to media members having to cast their ballots with five minutes left in the game.

Statistics

References

External links
USAToday.com recap of game

Sun Bowl
Sun Bowl
Minnesota Golden Gophers football bowl games
Oregon Ducks football bowl games
December 1999 sports events in the United States
1999 in sports in Texas